A fencepost, fence post or fencing post is a vertical element upholding a fence.

Fence post may also refer to:

 Steel fence post
 Tumblewheel, a movable fence post
 Fence post error, a mathematical problem
 Peruvian Fence Post, a cactus plant

See also
 Agricultural fencing
 Fencepost limestone
 Post (disambiguation)
 Post pounder, also called fence driver
 Roundpole fence